Joseph John Pullman (19 June 1876 – July 1955) was a Welsh international rugby union forward who played club rugby for Neath and the Glamorgan Constabulary. He won a single cap for Wales in the 1910 Five Nations Championship against France.

Rugby career
Pullman played the majority of his rugby for Neath and was elected first team captain for the 1914/15 season. In March 1908 he joined the Glamorgan Constabulary, where he eventually became a sergeant, and also turned out for the Glamorgan Constabulary rugby union team. On 1 January 1910, Pullman was selected for his one and only international appearance for Wales in the Five Nations Championship encounter with France. Pullman joined an experienced Wales team as a forward, with he and Bridgend's Ben Gronow as the only two new caps. The game was the first ever Five Nations Championship match, and the first time France had entered the tournament. Captained by Billy Trew, Wales dominated a hapless French team scoring ten tries in a 49-14 victory. Despite the victory Pullman was not reselected for the next game of the tournament and never represented Wales again.

International matches played
Wales
  1910

Bibliography

References

1876 births
1955 deaths
Glamorgan Police RFC players
Neath RFC players
Rugby union players from Cardiff
Rugby union forwards
Wales international rugby union players
Welsh police officers
Welsh rugby union players
Glamorgan Police officers